Juan Querol (born 21 August 1958) is a Cuban handball player. He competed in the men's tournament at the 1980 Summer Olympics.

References

External links
 

1958 births
Living people
Cuban male handball players
Olympic handball players of Cuba
Handball players at the 1980 Summer Olympics
Place of birth missing (living people)
Pan American Games medalists in handball
Pan American Games silver medalists for Cuba
Medalists at the 1987 Pan American Games